In England and Wales, the principle of the National Crime Recording Standard is to direct how statistics about notifiable offences  are collected by police forces. An important  distinction is made between notifiable offence recording and police incident reporting. The National Crime Recording Standard  is about how statistics about notifiable offences are recorded. The National Standard for Incident Recording direct how information and statistics about police non-crime incidents are recorded. The Government has delegated the task of inspecting a police forces compliance with the National Crime Recording Standard to Her Majesty’s Inspectorate of Constabulary and Fire Rescue Service (HMICFS), previously called Her Majesty’s Inspectorate of Constabulary.

History 

Since the 1920s, there have been processes for determining how police forces record notifiable Offence statistics. In 1998, The system was substantially changed. In 2002, a National Crime Recording Standard was introduced due to inconsistencies about how different police forces interpreted the crime recording rules.

A Home Office paper, published in 2014,  was critical of the notifiable offence statistics provided by police forces. In 2014, Her Majesty’s Inspectorate of Constabulary (HMIC), published the report, ‘Crime Recording-Making the Victim Count’. The report stated that overall notifiable offence recording was ‘inexcusably poor’, but identified that some police forces more satisfactorily recorded notifiable offences than others did. It found that an estimated 19% of notifiable offences reported to the police were not included in the statistics, notifiable offences reported to the police were without good reason 'no crimed' and removed by the police force from their statistics, and frequently victims were not informed of that decision. The authors of the report invited all police forces to respond to it.

Government response 
The Home Secretary delegates the responsibility for inspecting police forces to Her Majesty’s Inspectorate of Constabulary and Fire Rescue Service using powers invested in them by the Police Act 1996. On Friday 6 November 2015, all Chief Constables of police forces in England and Wales were informed that crime-recording practice would become part of police inspection reports. Her Majesty’s Inspectorate of Constabulary and Fire Rescue Service reports findings about how a police force is complying with crime recording standards is published on its website.

Home Office counting rules 
The Home Office decides and lists what is a notifiable offence, and when and how they must be recorded. It requires recording notifiable offences against both the State and those against identifiable victims.  It unambiguously states that the decision must be victim focused, following the ethos of the Code of Practice for Victims of Crime, and victims believed. It remarks that,

‘A belief by the victim or person reasonably assumed to be acting on behalf of the victim, that victim related crime has occurred is usually sufficient to justify its recording’.

Each police force has a Force Crime Registrar who is the final arbitrator in decision making about complying with the Home Office Counting Rules. The Home Office Counting Rules mention that the Force Crime Registrar must be managed outside operational command and instead answerable to the Chief Officer in that police for the ‘accuracy and integrity of crime recording processes’.

Crime recording issues 
Police Compliance

The reports about crime recording standards by Her Majesty’s Inspectorate of Constabulary and Fire & Rescue Service still demonstrate different standards throughout the country. For example, reports published early in 2018 record Devon and Cornwall police as ‘good’, Greater Manchester Police as ‘requiring improvement’, and Thames Valley Police as ‘inadequate’. The national media has taken an interest in police forces incorrectly recording crime, for example mentioning that in 2017 the North Yorkshire Police failed to record 9,200 notifiable offences, 1 in 5 crimes reported to it, including sexual offences, domestic abuse, and rapes.

'No-Criming'

No-criming is how a police force removes a notifiable offence from its statistics. In summary, there are five reasons for no-criming,

(1)The notifiable offences passed to another police force that has jurisdiction for the place for investigation and recording.

(2) Verifiable information exists that a notifiable offence was not committed.

(3) A duplicate record exists of a notifiable offence

(4) A notifiable offence  recorded in error

(5) An assault when evidence shows it was committed in self-defence.

Criticisms are made about no-criming. For example, it was found that 11% of rapes reported to the police were no-crimed, and rapes reported by vulnerable people, for instance, with mental health issues, are more likely to be no-crimed.

Statistic Accuracy

In 2014, the Office for National Statistics remarked that the reliability of the notifiable offence statistics is questionable. It mentioned that data users might not be aware of the limitations of the statistics. It decided that the notifiable offence statistics did not meet the quality standard required for National Statistics.

See also 
 Crime statistics in the United Kingdom

References

External links 
 Code of Practice for Victims of Crime

Crime statistics
Governance of policing in England
Governance of policing in Wales
Governance of policing in the United Kingdom